Kam idú ľudia? is the eighth solo album by Marika Gombitová released on OPUS in 1990. The title song was dedicated to Stevie Wonder.

Track listing

Official releases
 1990: Kam idú ľudia?, LP, MC, OPUS, #9353 2214
 1990: Kam idú ľudia?, CD, OPUS, #91 2214
 1995: Kam idú ľudia?, CD, Open Music, #91xx 2312
 1996: Kam idú ľudia?, CD, OPUS, #91 25xx 
 2004: Kam idú ľudia?: Komplet 8, 4 bonus tracks (SP "Mami, mami" and "Tváre pred zrkadlom", CD, OPUS, #91 2214

Credits and personnel

References

General

Specific

External links 
 

1990 albums
Marika Gombitová albums